André Tronc (born 27 May 1929) is a French curler.

Teams

References

External links
 

Possibly living people
1929 births
French male curlers
French curling champions